WDBC (680 AM) is a radio station licensed to Escanaba, Michigan broadcasting a full-service format featuring news, talk and adult contemporary music.

WDBC is Upper Michigan's most powerful AM radio station in terms of signal strength; its 10,000-watt daytime signal can be heard from Iron River in the west to St. Ignace in the east, and as far away as Green Bay, Wisconsin and Manistee, Michigan. On November 17, 2016, WDBC was granted a Federal Communications Commission construction permit to decrease day power to 6,000 watts.

FM Translator

WDBC has broadcast a variety of popular music formats over the years. In the 1970s it was a Top 40 music station and an affiliate of Casey Kasem's American Top 40 countdown show. In the 1980s and into the early 1990s, the station played Adult contemporary music. The station later went oldies and then standards, using the Music of Your Life format and then Jones Radio Networks' Jones Standards.

On September 30, 2008, Jones Radio Network discontinued Jones Standards following its purchase by Triton Media Group, owner of the Dial Global stable of 24/7 formats. Like many other Jones Standards outlets, WDBC switched over to Dial Global's "Adult Standards" (America's Best Music) network.

At midnight on February 10. 2020, WDBC discontinued Dial Global's "Adult Standards" (America's Best Music) network in favor of a format which included a mixture of adult standards and more contemporary music.

References

External links

Michiguide.com - WDBC History

DBC
Mainstream adult contemporary radio stations in the United States
Soft adult contemporary radio stations in the United States
Adult standards radio stations in the United States
Radio stations established in 1970
1970 establishments in Michigan